Elliot Morris (born 4 January 1996) is a professional rugby league footballer who plays as a  or  for Dewsbury Rams in the Betfred Championship.

References

External links
Halifax profile

1996 births
Living people
Dewsbury Rams players
English rugby league players
Halifax R.L.F.C. players
Rugby league players from Yorkshire
Rugby league props